Walter Reed (born Walter Reed Smith, February 10, 1916 – August 20, 2001) was an American stage, film and television actor.

Biography
Reed was born in 1916 in Fort Ward, Washington. Following a stint as a Broadway actor, Reed broke into films in 1941. He appeared in several features for RKO Radio Pictures, including the last two Mexican Spitfire comedies (in which Reed replaced Buddy Rogers as the Spitfire's husband). Perhaps his most memorable role was as the spineless wagon driver husband of Gail Russell in the western Seven Men from Now. Reed also appeared in the very first Superman theatrical feature film Superman and the Mole Men in 1951.

In 1951 Reed made two film serials for Republic Pictures; Reed strongly resembled former Republic leading man Ralph Byrd, enabling Republic to insert old action scenes of Byrd into the new Reed footage. Republic wanted to sign Reed for additional serials but Reed declined, preferring not to be typed as a serial star.

After appearing in 90 films and numerous television programs, such as John Payne's The Restless Gun and Joe Garrett in 1957 on Gunsmoke (S2E22), Reed changed careers and became a real estate investor and broker in Santa Cruz, California in the late 1960s.

Selected filmography

 Redskin (1929) - Indian Boy (uncredited)
 My Favorite Spy (1942) - Nightclub Patron (uncredited)
 The Mayor of 44th Street (1942) - Lou Luddy
 Mexican Spitfire's Elephant (1942) - Dennis Lindsay
 Army Surgeon (1942) - Dr. Bill Drake
 Seven Days' Leave (1942) - Ralph Bell
 Bombardier (1943) - Jim Carter
 Mexican Spitfire's Blessed Event (1943) - Dennis Lindsay
 Petticoat Larceny (1943) - Bill Morgan
 The Bamboo Blonde (1946) - Montgomery, Magazine Reporter (uncredited)
 Child of Divorce (1946) - Michael Benton
 Banjo (1947) - Dr. Bob
 Night Song (1947) - Jimmy
 Western Heritage (1948) - Joe Powell
 Return of the Bad Men (1948) - Bob Dalton
 Mystery in Mexico (1948) - Glenn Ames
 Angel on the Amazon (1948) - Jerry Adams
 Fighter Squadron (1948) - Capt. Duke Chappell
 Captain China (1950) - Martin
 Young Man with a Horn (1950) - Jack Chandler
 The Eagle and the Hawk (1950) - Jones
 The Torch (1950) - Dr. Robert Stanley
 The Lawless (1950) - Jim Wilson
 Flying Disc Man from Mars (1950, Serial) - Kent Fowler
 The Sun Sets at Dawn (1950) - The Chaplain
 Tripoli (1950) - Wade
 Charlie's Haunt (1950) - Larry (uncredited)
 Go for Broke! (1951) - Captain (uncredited)
 Wells Fargo Gunmaster (1951) - Ed Hines
 Government Agents vs. Phantom Legion (1951, Serial) - Hal Duncan
 The Racket (1951) - Policeman at Roll Call & in Locker Room (uncredited)
 Superman and the Mole-Men (1951) - Bill Corrigan
 Submarine Command (1951) - Chief O'Flynn
 Bronco Buster (1952) - Fred Wharton, Phoenix Announcer (uncredited)
 Target (1952) - Martin Conroy
 Red Ball Express (1952) - Major (uncredited)
 Desert Passage (1952) - John Carver
 Caribbean Gold (1952) - Evans, MacAllister's Foreman
 Horizons West (1952) - Layton
 Thunderbirds (1952) - Lt. Hammond
 The Blazing Forest (1952) - Max
 The Clown (1953) - Joe Hoagley
 Seminole (1953) - Farmer (uncredited)
 Sangaree (1953) - Conspirator in Boat (uncredited)
 The Man from the Alamo (1953) - Billings (uncredited)
 Latin Lovers (1953) - Hotel Clerk (uncredited)
 War Paint (1953) - Trooper Allison
 Those Redheads from Seattle (1953) - Whitey Marks
 Forever Female (1953) - Leading Man (uncredited)
 Dangerous Mission (1954) - Ranger Dobson
 The High and the Mighty (1954) - Mr. Field (uncredited)
 The Yellow Tomahawk (1954) - Keats
 Return from the Sea (1954) - Captain
 The Eternal Sea (1955) - Operations Officer
 Hell's Island (1955) - Lawrence
 The Far Horizons (1955) - Cruzatte (helmsman)
 The Last Command (1955) - Irate Texan in Cantina (uncredited)
 Bobby Ware Is Missing (1955) - Max Goodwin
 Seven Men from Now (1956) - John Greer
 Emergency Hospital (1956) - Police Sgt. Paul Arnold
 Dance with Me, Henry (1956) - Drake
 Three Brave Men (1956) - George Pryor (uncredited)
 Rock, Pretty Baby! (1956) - Mr. Reid
 Last of the Badmen (1957) - Fleming (Dillon's aide) (uncredited)
 The Lawless Eighties (1957) - Capt. Ellis North
 The Helen Morgan Story (1957) - Loring Kirk (uncredited)
 Slim Carter (1957) - Richard L. Howard
 The Deep Six (1958) - Paul Clemson
 Summer Love (1958) - Mr. Reid
 How to Make a Monster (1958) - Detective Thompson
 Arson for Hire (1959) - Chief Hollister
 Westbound (1959) - Julesburg Doctor (uncredited)
 The Horse Soldiers (1959) - Union Officer
 13 Fighting Men (1960) - Col. Jeffers
 Sergeant Rutledge (1960) - Capt. McAfee (uncredited)
 Macumba Love (1960) - J. Peter Weils
 Posse from Hell (1961) - Olly (uncredited)
 Sea Hunt (1961, Season 4, Episode: "Imposter") - Case Jarrett
 Advise & Consent (1962) - Senate Staff Clerk (uncredited)
 How the West Was Won (1962) - River Pirate (uncredited)
 The Carpetbaggers (1964) - Monica's Lay-out Artist (uncredited)
 Cheyenne Autumn (1964) - Lt. Peterson (uncredited)
 Where Love Has Gone (1964) - George Babson
 Fort Courageous (1965) - Doc
 Mirage (1965) - Reporter (uncredited)
 Convict Stage (1965) - Sam Gill
 The Money Trap (1965) - Detective (uncredited)
 Moment to Moment (1966) - Hendricks
 The Oscar (1966) - Pereira (uncredited)
 The Sand Pebbles (1966) - Bidder at Red Kettle Bar (uncredited)
 The Destructors (1968) - Admiral
 Star! (1968) - Photographer (uncredited)
 Panic in the City (1968) - Frank Devers
 A Time for Dying (1969) - Mayor
 Tora! Tora! Tora! (1970) - Vice Adm. William S. Pye (uncredited)

References

External links

 
 

Male actors from Santa Cruz, California
American male film actors
American male television actors
American male stage actors
20th-century American male actors
1916 births
2001 deaths
People from Bainbridge Island, Washington
Male actors from Washington (state)